The 1990 Arab Club Champions Cup is a tournament held between Arab clubs by UAFA. The preliminary round began, but the final tournament was cancelled because of the Gulf War.

Preliminary round

Zone 1 (Gulf Area)

Zone 2 (Red Sea)

Zone 3 (North Africa)

MC Alger advanced to the final tournament.

Zone 4 (East Region)
Preliminary round tournament held in Amman, Jordan from 7 to 15 July 1990.

Al-Faisaly and Al-Zawra'a advanced to the final tournament.

Final tournament
The final tournament was cancelled because Gulf War.

External links
8th Arab Club Champions Cup 1990 - rsssf.com

UAFA Club Cup, 1990
UAFA Club Cup, 1990
1990
Cancelled association football competitions